Bledlow Bridge Halt railway station was a halt on the Watlington and Princes Risborough Railway which the Great Western Railway opened in 1906 to serve the Buckinghamshire village of Bledlow. The opening of the halt was part of a GWR attempt to encourage more passengers on the line at a time when competition from bus services was drawing away patronage.

History
The halt was one of three that the GWR opened on the line in September 1906 to try to encourage passenger traffic in the face of increased competition from buses. It was situated to the north of Bledlow, on the northern side of Perry Lane adjacent to the railway overbridge which carried the Watlington and Princes Risborough Railway over the road. A flight of steps led up from the road to the station which had very basic facilities: a single low platform, no more than one coach-length long, a running in board and a small wooden passenger waiting shelter. The  needed for the waiting shelter were acquired by the railway company from Lord Carrington in 1909.

Responsibility for the halt was given to the stationmaster of the nearby Bledlow station on the Wycombe Railway. In winter a member of staff lit the lamps in the afternoon and the guard on the last train extinguished them. By the 1940s only a handful of people were reported to be using the halt which was convenient for a nearby children's home. In the long term the GWR's halt strategy did little to dissuade people from more convenient bus services. In 1957 British Railways closed the halt and withdrew passenger services from the line.

Present day 
Bledlow Bridge Halt has been rebuilt by the Chinnor and Princes Risborough Railway which has reopened the line through the station. The halt is not however open to passengers use.  The halt building was demolished when the line closed but the steps that lead up to the halt, although damaged and overgrown, are visible. Until 1957 when the line operated steps from the carriage were used to allow passengers to gain access so, although the platform remains, it is not used by the CPRR because of its height.

References

Sources

External links 
 Station on navigable 1946 O.S. map
 Image of the station in 1957
 Bledlow Bridge Halt on Subterranea Britannica

Disused railway stations in Buckinghamshire
Former Great Western Railway stations
Railway stations in Great Britain opened in 1906
Railway stations in Great Britain closed in 1957